Jonathan Pittis is a Canadian-born Italian professional ice hockey player who participated at the 2010 IIHF World Championship as a member of the Italian National men's ice hockey team.

References

External links

1982 births
Living people
Italian ice hockey forwards
Ice hockey people from Calgary